Aphelodoris brunnea, the variable dorid, is a species of dorid nudibranch, a marine gastropod mollusc in the family Dorididae.

Distribution
This species is endemic to South Africa, where it is known from Buffels Bay near Cape Point to East London. It is common off Port Elizabeth and is found from the low intertidal to 15 m.

Description

The variable dorid is a drably coloured nudibranch with a pale body and variable brown patterning. It has eight gills arranged around the anus and its rhinophores are perfoliate. It may reach a total length of 45 mm.

Ecology
The variable dorid probably feeds on sponges. When disturbed, the animal tries to escape by swimming, flexing its body up and down.

References

Dorididae
Gastropods described in 1907